A barrier vehicle (BV), barrier wagon, match wagon or translator coach is used to convert between non-matching railway coupler types.  This allows locomotives to pull railway vehicles or parts of a train with a different type of coupler. A match wagon has an identical dual coupling at both ends.

Use
They are often found on empty coaching stock moves where freight locomotives need to transport coaching stock fitted with Scharfenberg couplers and other automatic couplers.  The use of barrier coaches has evolved with a general move from conventional passenger trains consisting of locomotive-hauled coaches, to trains consisting of multiple units.

Liveries
These vehicles tend to be neutrally liveried or in some cases are painted with the livery of a particular rolling stock company. For example, Porterbrook use corporately-liveried examples for delivery of rolling stock and for transfers for refurbishment and maintenance.

Gallery

See also 
 Dual coupling
 Idler flatcar

References

Railway coaches of the United Kingdom